Bluebeat may refer to:

Ska music
Blue Beat Records
BlueBeat Music

See also

 Bluebead (disambiguation)
 Bluebeam (disambiguation)
 Bluebeard (disambiguation)